Gobius ater, Bellotti's goby, is a species of goby native to the Mediterranean Sea from the Balearic Islands and the Gulf of Lion to Nice and Sardinia. It occurs in shallow waters and lagoons where it prefers beds of the seagrass Posidonia oceanica.  This species can reach a length of  SL.

References 

Fish of the Mediterranean Sea
Fish of Europe
Gobius
Fish described in 1888